Daniel Martín (12 May 1935 – 28 September 2009) was a Spanish actor.

Martín was known for his role as Rafael in the film Los Tarantos (1963), directed by Francisco Rovira Beleta and starring Antonio Gades and Carmen Amaya. It was nominated for an Academy Award for Best Foreign Language Film at 36th edition. He played Condor in the Spaghetti western film Blood River (1974), starring Fabio Testi, John Ireland and Rosalba Neri, and Julián in A Fistful of Dollars (1964).

Martín died from pancreatic cancer in Nuévalos, Zaragoza, on 28 September 2009, at the age of 74.

Filmography

Films

 Los cuervos (1961) as Candidato del Dr. Kranich
 Las hijas del Cid (1962)
 Los guerrilleros (1963) (uncredited)
 Gunfight in the Red Sands (1963) as Manuel Martinez (as Dan Martin)
 Los Tarantos (1963) as Rafael
 Los felices sesenta (1963)
 A Fistful of Dollars (1964) as Julián (as Daniel Martin)
 Man Called Gringo (1965) as Gringo (as Dan Martin)
 The Last Tomahawk (1965) as Unkas (as Dan Martin)
 Fall of the Mohicans (1965) as Uncas
 La dama del alba (1966) as Martín
 Seven Magnificent Guns (1966) as Slim
 La busca (1966) as Vidal
 Último encuentro (1967) as Juan
 Mission Stardust (1967) as Captain Flipper
 Las 4 bodas de Marisol (1967) as Doctor Pierre Durán
 De cuerpo presente (1967) as Rod, el cowboy
 La cabeza del Bautista (1967, Short)
 Cada vez que... (1968) as Mark
 Un minuto para rezar, un segundo para morir (1968) as Father Santana (uncredited)
 They Came to Rob Las Vegas (1968) as Merino
 La banda de los tres crisantemos (1970) as Frank Olinger (as Danny Martin)
 Golpe de mano (1970) as Capitán Andújar
 Black Beauty (1971) as Lieutenant (as Daniel Martin)
 Dead Men Ride (1971) as Miner (as Daniel Martin)
 Let's Go and Kill Sartana (1971)
 Bad Man's River (1971) as False Montero
 Laia (1972) as Esteva (as Daniel Martin)
 Watch Out Gringo! Sabata Will Return (1972) as Luke Morton / Luck Morgan
 They Believed He Was No Saint (1972) as Paco
 Robinson and His Tempestuous Slaves (1972) as Lindas Komplize beim scheiternden Juwelenraub (uncredited)
 A Noose Is Waiting for You Trinity (1972) as Slim
 Crypt of the Living Dead (1973) as Gero
 La policía detiene, la ley juzga (1973) as Rico
 White Fang (1973) as Charlie
 Los fríos senderos del crimen (1974) as Fred Connor
 Blood River (1974) as Condor
 Demon Witch Child (1975) as William Grant
  (1975) as Juan Hernandez
 Los locos del oro negro (1975) as Jim (uncredited)
 My Husband Prefers Virgins (1975) as Comisario
 Los casados y la menor (1975) as Moisés
 Guerreras verdes (1976) as Primo
 Devil's Kiss (1976) as Richard
 El puente (1977) as Pijo en el viñedo
 Forbidden Love (1977) as Pedro
 Wifemistress (1977) as Carlos Valle (as Daniel Martin)
 Makarras Conexion (1977) as Jefe de la banda
 Jill (1978) as Arturo de Sousa
 Espectro (Más allá del fin del mundo) (1978) as Profesor Daniel del Valle
 La ciudad maldita (1978) as Max Thaler
 Inés de Villalonga 1870 (1979) as Teniente carlista
 Mystery on Monster Island (1981)
 Vivir mañana (1983) as Juan
 Siesta (1987) as Beaten Spaniard (as Daniel Martin)
 El Lute II: Tomorrow I'll Be Free (1988) as Vendedor inmobiliario (uncredited)
 Malaventura (1988) as Paco
 Al Andalus, el camino del sol (1989)
 Blood and Sand (1989) as Diego Fuentes (as Daniel Martin)
 Montoyas y Tarantos (1989) as Goyo Picao
 El equipo Aahhgg (1989) as Capataz
 A tiro limpio (1996) as Felipe
 Brazen Hussies (1996, TV Movie) as Terry
 Dollar for the Dead (1998, TV Movie) as Gambler - Sterling

Television

 La familia Colón (1967) as Luis Miguel / Curro
 Percy Stuart (1969)
 Sospecha (1970)
 Novela (1971)
 Cuentos y leyendas (1974)
 Los libros (1976) as Mauricio
 Curro Jiménez (1977) as Andrés
 Cervantes (1981)
 Las pícaras (1983)
 Los desastres de la guerra (1983)
 La huella del crimen (1985) as Policía 1º
 Página de sucesos (1985)
 Pepe Carvalho (1986) as Policía
 Turno de oficio (1986) as Cirujano
 El gran secreto (1989)
 Brigada central (1989) as Policía
 Blue Blood (1990) as Luis
 Réquiem por Granada (1991) as Fernandarias
 Don Quijote de la Mancha (1991)
 Canguros (1995)
 Médico de familia (1996) as Jacinto
 Éste es mi barrio (1996-1997)
 La vida en el aire (1998) as Jiménez
 Antivicio (2000)
 Hospital Central (2002) as Anciano Manuel / Hombre (final appearance)

References

External links
 

1935 births
2009 deaths
People from Cartagena, Spain
Spanish male film actors
Male Spaghetti Western actors
Deaths from pancreatic cancer
Deaths from cancer in Spain